AXN Spin is a television channel owned by Sony Pictures Television International. When was launched was aimed primarily at a younger audience, which broadcasts reality shows, cartoons, anime and television series, but now shows reruns of other AXN channels.

History 
It started broadcasting on January 11, 2012. It is available in Poland on satellite platforms: Cyfrowy Polsat and nc+ (HD version). From June 1, 2012, join to offer digital TV network UPC Polska and TOYA (SD version).
On March 1, 2013, was launched in Romania on UPC and in March 2015 on DIGI.
In 2014 was launched in Serbia, Montenegro, Croatia, Slovenia, Bosnia and Herzegovina and North Macedonia.

It available CAM modules in Conax, Irdeto, Mediaguard, Nagravision and Viaccess.

Logos

Programs

Reality televisions 
 American Idol
 Buried Life
 Criss Angel Mindfreak
 I Survived a Japanese Game Show
 Islanders - AXN Sziget 2011
 Unbeatable Banzuke

Television series

Animated series

References 

AXN
ANT1 Group
Television channels and stations established in 2012
Television channels in North Macedonia
Television channels in Poland
Anime television